State Road 45 is an IB-class road in Kosovo, connecting Dolac with Morina. 
Before the new road categorization regulation given in 2013, the route wore the name M 9.1.

The existing route is a main road with two traffic lanes.

Sections

See also 
 Roads in Kosovo
Roads in Serbia

Notes

References

External links 
 Official website - Roads of Serbia (Putevi Srbije)
 Official website - Corridors of Serbia (Koridori Srbije) (Serbian)

Roads in Kosovo
State roads in Serbia